RAN may refer to:

 Radio access network, a part of a mobile telecommunication system
 Rainforest Action Network
 Ran (gene) (RAs-related Nuclear protein), also known as GTP-binding nuclear protein Ran, a protein that in humans is encoded by the RAN gene
 Ran (Sufism), a concept of Sufism
 RAN translation (Repeat Associated Non-AUG translation), an irregular mode of mRNA translation 
 Ran Online (stylized as RAN Online), a massively multiplayer online role-playing game developed by Min Communications, Inc.
 RAN Remote Area Nurse (TV series)
 Rapid automatized naming, a predictor of reading ability
 Ravenna Airport, an airport in Ravenna, Italy by IATA code
 Régie du Chemin de Fer Abidjan-Niger, a railway in French West Africa, linking Côte d'Ivoire to Upper Volta (now called Burkina Faso)
 Remote Area Nurse, in Australia
 Royal Australian Navy, the naval branch of the Australian Defence Force
 Rugby Americas North, the administrative body of rugby union in North America and the Caribbean
 Russian Academy of Sciences (transliteration of its Russian acronym Rossiiskaya Akademiya Nauk)
 RAN (Indonesian group)

See also
 Ran (disambiguation)